Frederick C. Button ARIBA (1901–1969) was a British architect, the co-founder of Adie, Button and Partners.

Career
Button was mentored by Thomas Wallis of Wallis, Gilbert and Partners. By 1934, Button was an ARIBA and one of five partners in the firm, and "in charge of the execution of all plans and drawings".

With George Adie he co-founded Adie, Button and Partners. Notable buildings designed by the firm include the Park Lane Hotel in Piccadilly, the art deco apartment block at 59-63 Princes Gate, South Kensington (1937-8), the 1930s mansion Charters House in Sunningdale, Berkshire, which was used as a country retreat by Edward, Duke of Windsor and Wallis Simpson, and Stockwell bus garage, which opened in April, 1952.

Family 
He married Una Button. They had 3 children; two sons and a daughter. Frederick had a brother and a sister.

References

Associates of the Royal Institute of British Architects
20th-century British architects
1901 births
1969 deaths